Kikar HaShabbat is a Hebrew–language Israeli news website directed toward Haredi audience. It is named after an intersection in Jerusalem in a neighbourhood inhabited by Haredi Jews. A Globes study in 2017 found it as Israel's 9th most used news website.

History 
Kikar HaShabbat was started in 2009 by journalist Mordechai Lavi. In 2012, Israeli website Ynet acquired half of Kikar HaShabbat. From its founding to 2012 Menachem Cohen was the chief editor.

See also 
 Media of Israel

References

External links 
  

2009 establishments in Israel
Haredi Judaism in Jerusalem
Haredi media
Hebrew-language websites
Internet properties established in 2009
Israeli news websites
Israeli political websites
Judaism websites